USS Pulaski County (LST-1088) was a  of the United States Navy, named for seven counties in the United States.

Construction
LST-1088 was laid down by the American Bridge Company of Ambridge, Pennsylvania, on 16 December 1944. The ship was launched on 11 February 1945, sponsored by Mrs. A. J. Paddock; and commissioned at Algiers, Louisiana, on 27 March 1945.

Service history

World War II, 1945–1946
After shakedown off Florida, LST-1088 departed the Gulf Coast on 6 May for the Pacific. She put into Pearl Harbor, Eniwetok, Guam, Saipan, Manila, and Lingayen Gulf before landing occupation troops at Wakayama, Honshū, Japan on 28 October. She subsequently carried troops and cargo to Okinawa, Sasebo, Saipan, Pearl Harbor, and San Francisco, arriving there on 19 January 1946. In March she sailed for Portland, Oregon where she underwent pre-inactivation overhaul, was decommissioned on 29 August 1946, and berthed with the Columbia River Group, Pacific Reserve Fleet.

On 1 July 1955, LST-1088 was named USS Pulaski County (LST-1088). In 1961 Pulaski County was moved to the Reserve Group at Bremerton, Washington.

1963–1967
On 21 May 1963, she recommissioned and was assigned to Reserve LST Squadron 2 homeported in Little Creek, Virginia. The ship underwent refresher training at San Diego from 17 June to 2 July, then sailed on 20 July via the Panama Canal for Little Creek, arriving on 22 August.

In January and February 1964, Pulaski County transported obsolete ammunition from the Naval Ammunition Depot Earle, Monmouth County, New Jersey, for disposal at sea. She then operated along the east coast from Florida to New York, and provided training services for the Army at Little Creek. In late February 1965 Pulaski County supported a Project Gemini space flight. From 22 May through 25 August she supported Army troops during the Dominican Republic operations.

In early 1966 Pulaski County deployed from Little Creek to the Pacific via the Panama Canal. She spent most of the year in the western Pacific, particularly in South Vietnam, but also making port calls at Okinawa, The Philippines, Hong Kong and Sasebo, Japan. Her main duty was transporting cargo to Vietnam. She continued to operate in Vietnam and the Far East in early 1967. LST 1088 served in the Mekong Delta giving supplies to various stops including posts at Cần Thơ, Mỹ Tho, Nha Trang, Vung Tau, and Da Nang as well as support for PBRs on the river.  In July 1967 she was transferred to Military Sea Transportation Service (MSTS), and was redesignated USNS Pulaski County (T-LST-1088). She served with MSTS into 1970.

Disposal
Struck from the Navy List on 1 November 1973, Pulaski County was sold for scrapping on 1 January 1975 by the Defense Reutilization and Marketing Service.

Awards
Pulaski County earned two battle stars for Vietnam War service.

References

External links
 

 

World War II amphibious warfare vessels of the United States
Cold War amphibious warfare vessels of the United States
Vietnam War amphibious warfare vessels of the United States
Pulaski County, Arkansas
Pulaski County, Georgia
Pulaski County, Illinois
Pulaski County, Indiana
Pulaski County, Missouri
Pulaski County, Virginia
Ships built in Ambridge, Pennsylvania
1945 ships
Pacific Reserve Fleet, Bremerton Group
Pacific Reserve Fleet, Astoria Group
Monuments and memorials to Casimir Pulaski